, also referred to as Japanese Spider-Man, is a 1978 Japanese superhero film based on the Marvel Comics character Spider-Man and also a spin-off from the Japanese Spider-Man television series. The film was directed by Kōichi Takimoto, written by Susumu Takahisa, and produced and distributed by Toei Company.

Plot
The film takes place between episode 10 ("To the Flaming Hell: See the Tears of the Snake Woman") and 11 ("Professor Monster's Ultra Poisoning").

The Iron Cross Army are sabotaging oil-tankers with the help of their monster, the Sea-Devil, a semi-mechanical anthropomorphic swordfish with an ability to shoot torpedoes from its mouth. Spider-Man employs the help of the interpol agent Jūzō Mamiya to help him stop the Iron Cross Army. Spider-Man uses his remote controlled Marveller to prevent the Sea-Devil from bombing an industrial complex by making its missiles explode in the air. After that the monster's master makes it grow giant and Spider-Man has to use his Marveller to transform into a giant mech to fight the monster, after they exchange blows Spider-Man uses the mechs giant sword to disintegrate the Sea-Devil.

Cast
 Shinji Todō as Takuya Yamashiro / Spider-Man 
 Noboru Nakaya as Jūzō Mamiya

Production
The film was directed by Kōichi Takemoto and written by Susumu Takaku. The movie was the first appearance of the character of Juzo Mamiya, who subsequently appeared in three episodes of the series, episodes 11, 12 and 14. The film is the same length as the series episodes but was shot in widescreen.

The stunts in the film were choreographed and the acrobatics performed by the Japan Action Club (JAC).

Release
The film premiered on the Toei Manga Matsuri film festival on July 22, 1978. It was released in some non-American territories. Like the rest of the series, the film was made available for streaming on Marvel's official website in 2009. The movie appeared listed as "episode 0" on the site. Both the film and episodes were later taken down.

See also
 Spider-Man in film
 List of films featuring giant monsters

References

External links

 Post about the film from Brian Michael Bendis

Spider-Man films
Kaiju films
Featurettes
1970s American films
1970s Japanese films